Grillby is a locality situated in Enköping Municipality, Uppsala County, Sweden with 972 inhabitants in 2010.

References 

Populated places in Uppsala County
Populated places in Enköping Municipality